Huron (formerly Fenter) is an unincorporated community in Spice Valley Township, Lawrence County, in the U.S. state of Indiana.

History
Huron was platted in 1859. It was named after Huron, Ohio. On September 16, 1861, during the American Civil War, a train carrying 600 Illinois Union soldiers crashed into a creek near Huron, killing or injuring 100-150 soldiers.

Geography

References

Unincorporated communities in Lawrence County, Indiana
Unincorporated communities in Indiana